The perun (Montenegrin Cyrillic: Перун, older spelling: Перунъ) was the currency that was planned for introduction in Montenegro by Petar II Petrović Njegoš in 1851. However, he died the same year, and Montenegro later used the Austro-Hungarian krone until the 1906 introduction of the perper by Nicholas I of Montenegro. It was named after Perun, whom Njegoš considered to be the supreme god of Slavic mythology. If introduced, one Perun would have had equal value to two thalers.

See also 

 Montenegrin perper

References 
 Central Bank of Montenegro: Money in Montenegro in the Past and Nowadays

19th century in Montenegro
Proposed currencies
Currencies of Montenegro